Methylobacterium oxalidis  is a Gram-negative, facultatively methylotrophic, non-spore-forming and motile bacteria from the genus of Methylobacterium which has been isolated from the leaves of the plant Oxalis corniculata in Japan.

References

Further reading

External links
Type strain of Methylobacterium oxalidis at BacDive -  the Bacterial Diversity Metadatabase

Hyphomicrobiales
Bacteria described in 2012